Timothy or Tim Walker may refer to:

 Tim Walker (born 1970), British fashion photographer
 Tim Walker (politician) (1917–1986), Australian politician
 Timothy Walker (judge) (1802–1856), American lawyer
 Timothy Walker (civil servant) (born 1945), British civil servant
 Timothy Walker (botanist) (born 1958), British botanist
 Timothy Walker (actor) (born 1972), British television and film actor